Lebanese people in Greece  include immigrants and descendants of immigrants from Lebanon, numbering approximately 30,000 people of Lebanese descent. Migration from Lebanon to Greece started after 1975 during the Lebanese Civil War. Most Lebanese came from Koura District in North Lebanon, which is mostly a Greek Orthodox area. During the civil war the number of Lebanese was higher, however after the end of the war many returned to Lebanon.

Notable people
Rony Seikaly, Lebanese-born American basketballer, brought up in Athens.

See also
 Lebanese people in Cyprus, ca. 20,000 people
 Arabs in Greece
 Greeks in Lebanon

   
Greece